This is a list of New Thought writers, who have written significant primary works related to New Thought.  New Thought is also commonly referred to by such names as the "Law of Attraction" or "Higher Thought".



A 
 Alexander (magician) – The Life and Mysteries of the Celebrated Dr. Q and other books and pamphlets.
 James Allen (author) – As A Man Thinketh (1903); Above Life's Turmoil (1910); Byways to Blessedness.
 Uell Stanley Andersen – Three Magic Words (1954); The Secret of Secrets: Your Key to Subconscious Power (1958); The Magic in Your Mind (1961); The Key to Power and Personal Peace (1972); The Greatest Power in the Universe (1976); Happiness is the Secret of Secrets
 William Walker Atkinson – Thought-Force in Business and Everyday Life (1900); The Law of the New Thought: A Study of Fundamental Principles & Their Application (1902); Nuggets of the New Thought (1902); Thought Vibration or the Law of Attraction in the Thought World (1906); The Secret of Mental Magic: A Course of Seven Lessons (1907); Self-Healing by Thought Force (1907); The Secret of Success (1908); Practical Mental Influence (1908); The Mastery of Being: A Study of the Ultimate Principle of Reality & the Practical Application Thereof (1911); Your Mind and How to Use It: A Manual of Practical Psychology (1911); Practical New Thought: Several Things that Have Helped People (1911); Mental Pictures (article in "The Nautilus" magazine) (November 1912); Mind Power: The Secret of Mental Magic (1912); New Thought: Its History and Principles or The Message of the New Thought, A Condensed History of Its Real Origin with Statement of Its Basic Principles and True Aims (1915); The Seven Cosmic Laws (March 1931).

B 
 Raymond Charles Barker – Treat Yourself to Life; Money is God in Action
 Brandon Bays – The Journey: A Road Map to the soul; The Journey for Kids: Liberating your child's shining potential; Freedom Is: Liberating Your Boundless Potential; Consciousness: The New Currency; The Journey: A Practical Guide to Healing Your Life and Setting Yourself Free; Living The Journey: Using The Journey Method to Heal Your Life and Set Yourself Free
 Michael Beckwith – Spiritual Liberation: Fulfilling Your Soul's Potential
 Genevieve Behrend – Your Invisible Power (1921); How to Live Life and Love It (1922); Attaining Your Heart's Desire (1929)
 Joseph Sieber Benner – The Impersonal Life (1914); The Way Out (1930); The Way Beyond (1931)
 Clara Beranger – The Outlook Beautiful
 Ella Wheeler Wilcox – The Heart of the New Thought; New Thought Common Sense
 Stuart Wilde – Grace, Gaia, and the End of Days: An Alternative Way for the Advanced Soul
 Henry Wood – The New Thought Simplified: How to Gain Harmony and Health

Y 
 Paramahansa Yogananda – Autobiography of a Yogi (1946)
 Catherine Yronwode

Z 
 Gary Zukav – The Dancing Wu Li Masters: An Overview of the New Physics; The Seat of the Soul

See also 
 New Thought
 Law of Attraction (New Thought)
 List of New Thought denominations and independent centers

References 

 
Lists of writers